Mohovo is a village in Vukovar-Syrmia County in easternmost part of Croatia. It is administratively part of the town of Ilok.

Geography

It is located by the Danube, connected by the D2 highway to Opatovac in the west and Šarengrad to the east.

Demographics

According to the 2011 census, Mohovo had 239 inhabitants.

1991 census

1910 census

See also
 Church of the Transfiguration of the Lord, Mohovo

References

External links

Populated places in Vukovar-Syrmia County
Populated places in Syrmia
Ilok